Drishti and similar may refer to:
 Drishti (film), a 1990 Hindi film by Govind Nihalani
 Drishti (yoga), a part of yoga practice
 Drishti (client), a visualization tool for tomography and electron-microscopy data